SBCA may refer to:
Satellite Broadcasting and Communications Association, the national trade organization representing the consumer satellite industry in US
San Beda College Alabang, a college in Muntinlupa, Philippines

See also
SCBA (disambiguation)